The 2013–14 Adelaide United FC season was the club's ninth A-League season. It included the 2013–14 A-League season as well as other competitions of the 2013–14 football (soccer) season.

In the winter transfer window, newly appointed manager Josep Gombau was quick to add Spanish flavour into the squad. He brought in fellow Spaniards Sergio Cirio and Isaías. He also added other players including Tarek Elrich and Steven Lustica, Michael Zullo for a season long loan and Brent McGrath as a four-week injury replacement player. Awer Mabil and Jordan Elsey were also promoted from the youth system, each rewarded with two-year contracts. The club also let four contracts expire; those of Iain Ramsay, Tomi Juric, Fabian Barbiero and Evan Kostopoulos. Iain Fyfe and Zenon Caravella both had their contracts cut short and terminated. Sergio van Dijk was transferred to Persib Bandung and Dario Vidošić to FC Sion for a reported $700,000 transfer fee.

The Reds had a shaky start to their season under new manager Gombau. They had only a single win in their first nine games for the season and early calls started for the club to show the door to the new man in charge. Gombau quickly changed the club's fortunes, getting his second win in round 10 against the Central Coast Mariners, with a 4–0 result. The team continued this form to finish sixth on the table after the 27 home-and-away games, which let them into the finals by two points. Adelaide's season was ended by Central Coast in the elimination final, losing 1–0.

The Reds' highest attendance in the 2013–14 season was 16,504 in the round 2 clash with Melbourne Victory at Hindmarsh Stadium which ended in a 2–2 draw.

Players

Squad information

Transfers

Re-signed

Winter

In

Out

Summer

In

Out

Player statistics

Squad stats

Scorers

A-League

Club

Coaching staff

Source:Football Australia

Managerial Changes

Attendance at home games

Pre-season and friendlies
Kick-off times are in ACST/ACDT.

Competitions

Overall

A-League

League table

Results summary

Results by round

Matches
Kick-off times are in ACST/ACDT.

Finals series

Awards
 Player of the Week (Round 10) – Sergio Cirio
 Player of the Week (Round 20) – Sergio Cirio
 Player of the Week (Round 21) – Fábio Ferreira
 Player of the Week (Round 24) – Marcelo Carrusca

References

External links
 Official website

Adelaide United FC seasons
2013–14 A-League season by team